SR-57227 is a potent and selective agonist at the 5HT3 receptor, with high selectivity over other serotonin receptor subtypes and good blood–brain barrier penetration.

References 

Serotonin receptor agonists
5-HT3 agonists
Piperidines
Chloroarenes
Aminopyridines